The Designation Scheme is an English system that awards "Designated status" to museum, library and archive collections of national and international importance. The Scheme is administered by Arts Council England (ACE).  As of 2020, 152 collections are officially designated.  National museums are not eligible for Designated status.

The Scheme was first launched in 1997 under the auspices of what eventually became the Museums, Libraries and Archives Council (MLA) and originally covered only museum collections. Harewood House became the first stately home to be awarded Designated status in 1998. The scheme was expanded to cover libraries and archives in 2005. Responsibility was transferred to the Arts Council in October 2011 following the closure of the MLA.

Designated collections

 Ashmolean Museum, Oxford
 Barber Institute of Fine Arts, Birmingham
 The Baring Archive, London
 Bath & North East Somerset Heritage Services
 Fashion Museum, Bath
 Roman Baths Museum
 Bath Record Office
 Birmingham Libraries (The Photography Collection, The Archives, Early and Fine Printing Collections, Literature Collections, The Birmingham Collection, The Music Collection)
 Birmingham Museums Trust (Fine and decorative arts, science and industry, Birmingham history (including numismatics), the Pinto collection)
 Birmingham Museum & Art Gallery (main site)
 Aston Hall
 Blakesley Hall
 Jewellery Quarter
 Sarehole Mill
 Soho House (main site)
 Beamish Museum, County Durham
 The Tank Museum, Bovington Camp
 Bowes Museum, Durham
 Black Country Living Museum, Dudley
 Bradford Industrial Museum (Worsted Collection)
 British Motor Museum (entire holdings of motor cars, motoring related artefacts and archive material)
 The British Postal Museum and Archive (The Royal Mail Archive)
 Bristol City Council Museums, Galleries & Archives Service (Collections related to Bristol’s role as a manufacturing city and major seaport)
 Bristol City Museum and Art Gallery (main site)
 Bristol Industrial Museum
 Georgian House
 Red Lodge
 Blaise Castle House Museum
 Bristol Archives and Bristol Central Library’s Local Studies Service
 Britten-Pears Library, Aldeburgh
 BT Heritage (BT Archives)
 Cambridge University Herbarium
 Cambridge University Museum of Zoology
 Cambridge University Library (special collections)
 Cheltenham Art Gallery & Museum (The arts and crafts collections)
 Chesterholm Museum – Vindolanda
 Chetham's Library (The whole of the collections)
 Colchester Castle Museum (Archaeology collections)
 Compton Verney, Warwickshire (Archaic Chinese bronzes)
 Cornwall Record Office (The archives relating to Cornwall's hard-rock mining industry)
 Corporation of London (Guildhall Library and London Metropolitan Archives) (The History of London collection)
 Courtauld Gallery, London
 Coventry Transport Museum
 Derby Museum and Art Gallery (The Joseph Wright of Derby collection)
 Dulwich Picture Gallery, London
 Durham University Library (The Bishop Cosin’s Library and The Sudan Archive)
 Durham University Oriental Museum (Egyptian and Chinese collections)
 English Folk Dance and Song Society (Vaughan Williams Memorial Library)
 Fitzwilliam Museum, Cambridge
 Glasgow Women's Library, Glasgow
 Hampshire Record Office, Winchester
 Harewood House, Harewood, Leeds
 Horniman Museum and Gardens, London (The musical instruments collections and ethnographic collections)
 Institution of Engineering and Technology, London
 Institution of Civil Engineers, London (The library, archive, and works of Art)
 Ironbridge Gorge Museum Trust
 Coalbrookdale Museum of Iron including Old Furnace
 Blists Hill Victorian Town
 Coalport China Museum
 Jackfield Tile Museum
 Broseley Pipeworks
 Darby Houses
 Library and Archives
 Jewish Museum, London (The Ritual Judaica collection)
 John Rylands Library, the University of Manchester
 Kensington Royal Palace (royal ceremonial dress collection)
 King's College London (Liddell Hart Centre for Military Archives)
 Kingston upon Hull City Museums and Art Galleries
 Ferens Art Gallery
 Hull and East Riding Museum
 Hull Maritime Museum
 Streetlife Museum of Transport
 Wilberforce House
 Lambeth Palace Library
 Lancashire County Museum Service (The textile industry collections)
 Higher Hill Museum, Helmshore
 Whitaker's Mill, Helmshore
 Queen Street Mill, Burnley
 Lapworth Museum of Geology, Birmingham
 Leeds Museums and Galleries (Natural science, fine and decorative arts, and industrial collections)
 Leeds City Art Gallery
 Leeds City Museum
 Lotherton Hall
 Temple Newsam House
 Armley Mills Industrial Museum
 Thwaite Mills Museum
 Leeds University Library Special Collections (The English Literature Collection, The Romany Collection, The Cookery Collection, The Leeds Russian Archive, The Liddle Collection)
 The Library and Museum of Freemasonry, Freemasons' Hall, London
 Lincolnshire Archives, Lincoln (Episcopal Rolls and Registers)
 Linnean Society of London (entirety of the Linnean Society’s library, archive and biological specimen collections)
 Liverpool and Merseyside Record Offices (Photographic image collection)
 London School of Economics and Political Science
 British Library of Political and Economic Science
 The Women's Library @ LSE
 London Transport Museum
 Manchester City Galleries (Fine and decorative art, and Costume collections)
 Manchester City Art Gallery
 Platt Hall, the Gallery of Costume
 Wythenshawe Hall
 Heaton Hall
 Manchester Museum
 Mary Rose Trust, Portsmouth
 Museum of Archaeology and Anthropology, University of Cambridge
 Museum of Domestic Design and Architecture, London (The Silver Studio collection)
 Museum of London and Museum of London Docklands
 Museum of Science and Industry in Manchester
 Museum of the History of Science, Oxford
 National Co-operative Archive, Co-operative College, Manchester
 National Football Museum, Manchester (core collections)
 National Motor Museum, Beaulieu, Hampshire
 National Tramway Museum, Crich
 Norfolk Record Office (Collections relating to the history of Norfolk)
 Northampton Central Museum and Art Gallery (Boot and Shoe Collection)
 Nottingham City Museums and Galleries (The Lace Machinery and Lace Collections)
 Norwich Castle Museum and Art Gallery
 Oxford University Library (Special collections at the Bodleian Library: Rare books, Manuscripts and Archives, Maps, Music, and Oxford University Archives)
 Oxford University Museum of Natural History
 People's History Museum, Manchester
 Petrie Museum, London
 Pitt Rivers Museum, Oxford
 Plymouth City Museum and Art Gallery (The Cottonian collection)
 Porthcurno Telegraph Museum (core collection of submarine telegraphy objects and the historic archive collections of key international telegraph cable companies)
 Royal Academy of Arts, London (collections, library and archive)
 Royal Academy of Music, London (The Special Collections and Archives of the Royal Academy of Music Library)
 Royal Albert Memorial Museum, Exeter (world cultures collections and the Montagu collection)
 Royal Artillery Collection
Royal College of Music Museum and Library Collections
 Royal College of Surgeons of England (Hunterian Museum Collection, Library and Archive)
 Royal Engineers Museum, Chatham
 Royal Geographical Society (with Institute of British Geographers) (All geographical collections)
 Royal Horticultural Society, London (Lindley Library)
 Royal Institute of British Architects, London (The British Architecture Library)
 Royal Pavilion, Libraries and Museums (Brighton and Hove) (Decorative arts, World Art and Anthropology, and Natural History)
 Brighton Museum & Art Gallery
 Royal Pavilion
 Preston Manor
 Booth Museum of Natural History
 St John's College, Cambridge (Old Library collection)
 Salisbury and South Wiltshire Museum (The archaeology collections)
 Sedgwick Museum of Earth Sciences, Cambridge
 Shakespeare Birthplace Trust and Royal Shakespeare Company, Stratford Upon Avon (All collections relating to Shakespeare’s life and times)
 Sheffield City Museum (Metalwork collections)
 Sir John Soane's Museum, London
 Southampton City Council Cultural Services
 Southampton City Art Gallery
 Museum of Archaeology, Southampton
 SS Great Britain (SS Great Britain collection)
 Staffordshire and Stoke-on-Trent Archive Service
 Stoke-on-Trent Museums Service
 Potteries Museum
 Etruria Industrial Museum
 Ford Green Hall
 Torquay Museum (Quaternary Cave Collection and associated archive)
 Tullie House Museum and Art Gallery (natural science collection)
 Tyne and Wear Archives (Shipbuilding, Marine and Maritime Trade Collection)
 Tyne and Wear Museums (Fine and Decorative Arts, Natural Sciences, and Science and Technology Collections)
 Discovery Museum
 Laing Art Gallery
 Monkwearmouth Station Museum
 Shipley Art Gallery
 South Shields Museum and Art Gallery
 Stephenson Railway Museum
 Sunderland Museum and Art Gallery
 Washington 'F' Pit Museum
 Unilever Archives & Records Management (Unilever plc), Manchester (archive of the United Africa Company and all permanent archive collections)
 University of Bristol Theatre Collection
 University of Birmingham Library (The Mingana Collection of Middle Eastern Manuscripts)
 University of Cambridge Churchill Archives Centre
 University of Nottingham (The D. H. Lawrence collection; collections related to the Portland (London), Portland of Wellbeck and Newcastle of Clumber families)
 University of Reading
 Archive of British Publishing and Printing
 Library (The Beckett Collection)
 Museum of English Rural Life
 University of Sussex Library (The Mass-Observation Archive)
 University of Warwick Modern Records Centre
 Waterways Trust
 National Waterways Museum, Gloucester (lead site)
 Ellesmere Port museum, Ellesmere Port
 Canal Museum, Stoke Bruerne
 Weald and Downland Open Air Museum, Chichester
 Wedgwood Museum, Barlaston, Stoke on Trent
 Wellcome Trust (All collections within the Wellcome Library)
 Westminster Libraries and Archives (The Art and Design collection)
 Whipple Museum of the History of Science, Cambridge
 Whitworth Art Gallery, Manchester
 Wiener Library, London
 William Morris Gallery, London (William Morris and Morris & Co. collection)
 Wiltshire Museum, Devizes
 Wordsworth Trust, Dove Cottage, Lake District
 York Museums Trust
 York Castle Museum
 York City Art Gallery
 The York Story
 Yorkshire Museum

See also 
 Designated landmark (US)
 Designated place (Canada)

References

Designation Scheme
Museology
Lists of museums
Designation Scheme
Lists of libraries